803 Picka (prov. designation:  or ) is a large and dark background asteroid from the outer regions of the asteroid belt. It was discovered on 21 March 1915, by Austrian astronomer Johann Palisa at the Vienna Observatory. It was named after Czech physician Friedrich Pick (1867–1921).

Orbit and classification 

Picka is a non-family asteroid of the main belt's background population when applying the hierarchical clustering method to its proper orbital elements. It orbits the Sun in the outer asteroid belt at a distance of 3.0–3.4 AU once every 5 years and 9 months (2,094 days; semi-major axis of 3.2 AU). Its orbit has an eccentricity of 0.07 and an inclination of 9° with respect to the ecliptic. The body's observation arc begins with its official discovery observation by Johann Palisa at Vienna Observatory on 21 March 1915.

Naming 

This minor planet was named after Czech physician Friedrich Pick (1867–1921) from Prague , who was the first physician to introduce endoscopic methods in medicine. According to the 1917 edition of the astronomical calendar in German "Astronomischer Kalender für 1917", the asteroid was named by friends of the discoverer Johann Palisa. The  was mentioned in The Names of the Minor Planets by Paul Herget in 1955.

Physical characteristics 

In the SDSS-based taxonomy, Picka is a dark D-type asteroid. In the 1995 SMASS-I survey by Xu, it is classified as an uncommon T-type with some similarities to a D-type (TD). The D-types asteroids are common in the outer main-belt and are very abundant among the Jupiter trojan population.

Rotation period 

In April 2007, a rotational lightcurve of Picka was obtained from photometric observations by French amateur astronomer Pierre Antonini. Lightcurve analysis gave a well-defined rotation period of  hours with a high brightness variation of  magnitude, indicative of an elongated shape.

Lightcurve inversion also modeled the body's shape and poles. In 2013, modelling by an international study using photometric data from the US Naval Observatory, the Uppsala Asteroid Photometric Catalogue, the Palomar Transient Factory and the Catalina Sky Survey gave a concurring sidereal period of  hours and two spin axes at (218.0°, 34.0°) and (53.0°, 41.0°) in ecliptic coordinates (λ, β). The body's very elongated shape had already been indicated by the relatively high brightness variation measured during the direct photometric observations.

Diameter and albedo 

These timed observations are taken when the asteroid passes in front of a distant star. This observation still has received a low quality rating.

References

External links 
 Lightcurve Database Query (LCDB), at www.minorplanet.info
 Dictionary of Minor Planet Names, Google books
 Asteroids and comets rotation curves, CdR – Geneva Observatory, Raoul Behrend
 Discovery Circumstances: Numbered Minor Planets (1)-(5000) – Minor Planet Center
 
 

000803
Discoveries by Johann Palisa
Named minor planets
19150321